Minnie Cumnock Blodgett (1862–1931) graduated from Vassar College in 1884, later becoming a trustee (1917–1931). She is the mother of Katharine Blodgett Hadley (VC '20), who was also a Vassar trustee (1942–1954), and was chairman of the Board (1945–1952).

Her husband, John W. Blodgett, built their estate, which they named Brookby, where they made their Grand Rapids home.

Vassar College and Euthenics program
After Ellen Swallow Richards' death in 1911, Julia Lathrop (1858–1932), another of Vassar's most distinguished alumnae, continued to promote the development of an interdisciplinary program in euthenics at the college.  Lathrop soon teamed with alumna Minnie Cumnock Blodgett, who with her husband, John Wood Blodgett, offered financial support to create a program of euthenics at Vassar College.  Curriculum planning, suggested by Vassar President Henry Noble MacCracken in 1922, began in earnest by 1923.

In 1925, through a gift of $550,000.00 from Mrs. Blodgett, the Institute of Euthenics was founded at Vassar.  Its aim was "to supply scientific knowledge of the complex problems of adjustment between individuals and the environment, emphasizing home and family." Vassar historian Colton Johnson noted "The Blodgetts' gift was the largest gift given to the College after Matthew Vassar donated $408,000 in 1861 to get the College started ... Their intention was to bring into the curriculum of the College a course of study specifically designed around the ideas of Ellen Swallow Richards."

Death
Minnie Cumnock Blodgett died suddenly of heart disease on October 13, 1931 in her suite in The St. Regis Hotel, New York, NY.  She was there to attend meetings for two health organizations and spend some time visiting her daughter and son-in-law.  According to her obituary in the New York Times, she was a director of  the Child Study Association, the National Organization for Public Health Nursing, and was a member of the National Committee on Mental Hygiene. She was the daughter of the late Mr. and Mrs. Alexander G. Cunnock [sic] of Lowell, Mass. She was also president of the D.A. Blodgett Home for Children, and sat on the board of trustees at Vassar College.

Descendants
Descendants include:
 John Wood Blodgett, Jr., who married Sally Reed Gallagher, of Milton, MA, on September 28, 1939. He attended St. Mark's School in Southboro, and graduated Harvard in 1923.
 Kathrine Cumnock Blodgett Hadley, who married Major Morris Hadley, July 12, 1919.
 John Wood Blodgett Hadley (1930 - 1994). who married Katrina Boyden Hadley (1930-1969), she is buried in the Blodgett Plot.

Blodgett Family Archives
According to the Finding aid for Blodgett Family papers, 1872-1953  abstract at Bentley Historical Library within the University of Michigan Digital Library, the archive contains :

Further reading
 
 Jeffrey Sytsma, "Health Care Pioneers: The Blodgett Family." Michigan History, Jan/Feb 2020, pp. 33-38. Lansing, Michigan: Historical Society of Michigan.

References

1862 births
1931 deaths
Vassar College alumni
Members of the Vassar College Board of Trustees
People from Lowell, Massachusetts
People from East Grand Rapids, Michigan